Westville Road is an unincorporated community in the Canadian province of Nova Scotia, located  in Pictou County.   The nearest neighbouring community is Riverview, and the towns of Westville and Stellerton are each about 3 km away.  The main road through the community, Westville Road, leads to the TransCanada Highway.

References
Westville Road entry in Nova Scotia Geographical Names (Department of Service Nova Scotia & Municipal Relations)

Communities in Pictou County
General Service Areas in Nova Scotia